General Olusegun Obasanjo became head of state in Nigeria on 14 February 1976 after the assassination of General Murtala Mohammed. He replaced or reassigned many of the state governors, and broke up some of the larger states into two or three new states. Obasanjo continued the transition to democracy with the Nigerian Second Republic, began under General Murtala Mohammed, allowing the election of civilian governors who replaced the military appointees in October 1979.

Government of Nigeria
Politics of Nigeria